Antonina Vitalyevna Skorobogatchenko (born 14 February 1999) is a Russian handballer for HBC CSKA Moscow and the Russian national team.

In the summer of 2017, Skorobogatchenko tested positive for meldonium at the 2017 European Junior Championship.

Individual awards 
 All-Star Right Back of the EHF U-17 European Championship: 2015
 All-Star Right Back of the IHF Junior World Championship: 2016
 All-Star Right Back of the IHF Youth World Championship: 2016

References

External links

1999 births
Living people
Sportspeople from Volgograd
Russian female handball players
Russian sportspeople in doping cases
Handball players at the 2020 Summer Olympics
Medalists at the 2020 Summer Olympics
Olympic medalists in handball
Olympic silver medalists for the Russian Olympic Committee athletes
Doping cases in handball